Viola canina (heath dog-violet or heath violet) is a species of the genus Viola, native to Europe, where it is found in heaths, fens, and moist woodlands, especially on acidic soils.

It is a herbaceous perennial plant growing to 5–15 cm tall. The flowers are pale blue, produced from April to July. Colonies of plants may be extensive.

It is host to the pathogenic fungi Puccinia violae and Ramularia lactea.

References

canina
Plants described in 1753
Taxa named by Carl Linnaeus
Flora of Europe
Flora of Finland
Flora of Russia
Flora of Great Britain